Dennis Atiyeh (born 18 December 1963) is a Syrian wrestler. He competed in the men's freestyle 130 kg at the 1988 Summer Olympics. His brother, Joseph Atiyeh, is also a wrestler.

References

External links
 

1963 births
Living people
Syrian male sport wrestlers
Olympic wrestlers of Syria
Wrestlers at the 1988 Summer Olympics
Sportspeople from Allentown, Pennsylvania
20th-century Syrian people